Docs may refer to:

 Department of Community Services
 Display Operator Console System, DOCS (software) package
 Docs.com
 Colloquial term for Dr. Martens footwear.
 Google Docs

See also
 DOC (disambiguation)
 Dock (disambiguation)